, also known as , is a free-to-play collectible card browser video game launched in Japan on November 1, 2016 with a mobile port of the game releasing on June 14, 2017. The game is developed by EXNOA and published by DMM.com.

Gameplay
To obtain these writers, you are also tasked to delve into ensouled books in order to transmigrate and recruit them into your library.

The writers in the game are depicted as bishonen. The designs for each character were partially inspired by their real life counterparts, with each of them holding a book with the covers designed to be similar to a book they had written in real life, though the design of their hairstyles are entirely made up by the designers of the game.

Development
The idea for the game was proposed by Kōhei Taniguchi as a game where players would collect fictional characters from works of Japanese literature but, after talking with Jiro Ishii the two decided to make the game about the authors instead. Taniguchi was responsible for the game's concept planning while Ishii was responsible for the world-building. The two of them originally felt a little off about having writers fight using weapons but, after coming up with the idea of the writers delving into tainted books and making the setting somewhat fantasy-like, Ishii and Taniguchi liked the idea enough to implement it. The idea for obtaining the writers through transmigration came after, Ishii came up with the idea of obtaining writers by dragging them out of the books after the two settled on setting the game in a library.

Early on, they also decided to add writers which have strong connections with other writers who are already in game as both creators wanted to show the relationships of their real-life counterparts. Taniguchi also expressing that he would like to explore how some of the writers would interact with one another by mirroring how they felt about one another in real-life.

Characters
Characters featured in the game are based on real-life writers mainly from Japan along with a few writers from the western hemisphere. The weapons the writers use in-game are usually representative of their main body of literary work.

Blades - Representing writers who mainly had written novels and short stories.

Bows - Representing writers who mainly had written Naturalist literature.

Whips - Representing writers who had written popular literature.

Guns - Representing poets and writers of children's literature.

Anime adaptation

In 2020, the series received an anime television series adaptation by OLM titled . The series ran for 13 episodes from April 3 to August 7, 2020. It was licensed in North America by Funimation. Following Sony's acquisition of Crunchyroll, the series was moved to Crunchyroll.

References

External links
  

2016 video games
Anime television series based on video games
Browser games
Digital collectible card games
Fantasy video games
Free-to-play video games
Crunchyroll anime
Japan-exclusive video games
OLM, Inc.
Role-playing video games
TV Tokyo original programming
Video games developed in Japan
DMM Games games